The Praja Socialist Party, abbreviated as PSP, was an Indian political party. It was founded when the Socialist Party, led by Jayaprakash Narayan, Rambriksh Benipuri, Acharya Narendra Deva and Basawon Singh (Sinha), merged with the Kisan Mazdoor Praja Party led by J. B. Kripalani (former president of the Indian National Congress and a close associate of Jawaharlal Nehru).

It led the cabinet under Pattom A. Thanu Pillai as chief minister of State of Travancore-Cochin from March 1954 to February 1955. A section led by Rammanohar Lohia broke from the party in 1955, resuming the name "Socialist Party". It again came to power in the new state of Kerala under Pattom A. Thanu Pillai from February 1960 to September 1962. In 1960, Kripalani left the party and in 1964, Asoka Mehta joined Congress after his expulsion from the party.

Another section of the party, led by the trade union leader George Fernandes, broke off to become the Samyukta Socialist Party in 1969. In 1972, a section merged with Fernandes' party to become the Samyukta Socialist Party/Socialist Party once more, before becoming part of the Janata coalition in 1977 following the Emergency.

Formation
In September 1952, the Kisan Mazdoor Praja Party merged with the Socialist Party with J. B. Kriplani as the chairman and Asoka Mehta as the general secretary.

Elections
At the party's first general election in 1957, the PSP won 10.41% of the total votes and 19 seats in the Lok Sabha. However, the party's vote share continued to decline over the next few elections. It won 6.81% of the total votes and 12 seats in the Lok Sabha in 1962, 3.06% of the total votes and 13 seats in the Lok Sabha in 1967 and only 1.04% of the total votes and only 2 seats in the Lok Sabha in 1971.

See also 

 List of political parties in India

References

 
1952 establishments in India
1972 disestablishments in India
Defunct political parties in India
Political parties established in 1952
Political parties disestablished in 1972